The Ministry of Information, Culture, Arts and Sports is a government ministry of Tanzania. The ministry was founded in 2006 by presidential notice, merging extant sections of sports, information, and culture into one functional ministry.

Organization and operations

Departments of the Ministry include the following:

Information Development
Department is responsible to collect, write and disseminate government statements; to collect and disseminate news and news  material; to organize government news conferences and news briefings; to monitor and coordinate news bureaus, radio news and television news, and other information-related duties.

Culture Development
 Traditions and culture; arts, music, cinema; languages
Bagamoyo College of Art

Sports Development
 Registration of leagues and associations; planning and construction of stadiums and sports facilities;  stadium management; sports infrastructure development.
Tanzania Football Federation

Policy & Planning
Policy and planning

Administration
Administration

See also
Government of Tanzania

References

External links
 

Information, Culture, arts and Sports
Tanzania
Tanzania
Tanzania
Sport in Tanzania
Tanzania, Information, Culture, Arts and Sports
2006 establishments in Tanzania